Richard Winkler (born June 26, 1969) is a Swedish painter and sculptor.

Biography 
Artist Richard Winkler was born in 1969 in Norrköping Sweden. He studied graphic design and illustration at Beckman's School of Design in Stockholm. For several years he was working as an illustrator for advertising agencies and magazines. In 1997, he moved to Bali, Indonesia, where he currently lives with his wife and two daughters and now works as a full-time artist.

Richard is primarily known for his colorful and light contemporary art. His paintings celebrate corpulent figures in bright color, frequently popping up in either mysterious landscapes or detailed floral settings, all inspired by his life in Bali. Since his days as a student, Winkler has experimented with various ways to depict the human body. His practice in this area has resulted in a personal expressive style that is distinctive.  His name frequently conjures up images of tubular human figures and colorful paddy fields in a tropical Balinese setting.

Collection 
Bali has had an important influence on Winkler's work. His earlier paintings were focused on the abstract lines and curves of the human body, in particular the exaggerated curves of the limbs. These later became more and more human likes-after his move to Bali in 1997. During the autumn of 2009, Richard had his 9th solo exhibition in ARTSingapore, where critics called Richard and his work the star of the show

To the delight of his collectors', Winkler's versatility extends beyond two-dimensional works. His recently completed sculptures illustrate his obsession with the human body. Just like his paintings, Winkler has successfully executed his idea of a perfect female figure and presented it in the three-dimensional bronzes. These artworks were exhibited for the first time in Art Bazaar Jakarta on August 2009.

Gallery

Notes

External links 
 Richard Winkler's official homepage
 About Richard Winkler on the homepage of Winsor & Newton
 Richard Winkler in Artnet
 Richard Winkler Profile in Zola Zulu Gallery
 Art Radars article about Richard Winkler and ARTSingapore 2009

20th-century Swedish painters
Swedish male painters
21st-century Swedish painters
Swedish male sculptors
1969 births
Living people
20th-century sculptors
20th-century Swedish male artists
21st-century Swedish male artists